Senator Merritt may refer to:

Jim Merritt (politician) (born 1959), Indiana State Senate
Matthew F. Merritt (1815–1896), Connecticut State Senate
Samuel Augustus Merritt (1827–1910), California State Senate